Chalan Kanoa (Old Japanese name: 茶覧, Charan) is one of the settlements on Saipan, the largest of the Northern Mariana Islands. It is located in the southwest of the island. The village contains the island's central post office, as well as the historic Our Lady of Mount Carmel Cathedral and Mount Carmel School, directed by the Spanish Mercedarian Missionaries of Berriz. Once a separate village, it is now virtually contiguous with other nearby villages on Beach Road, including Susupe and San Antonio.

Prior to the emergence of Garapan as the center for tourism in Saipan in the 1990s, most of the island's tourist sector was based in Chalan Kanoa.

The village of Chalan Kanoa is considered to be one of the newest villages on the island.

One of the islands main thoroughfares, Beach Road (Highway 33), runs through Chalan Kanoa and connects it to the rest of the island.

As tourism is a large part of Saipan's economy, there are quite a few hotels located in the village.  These include the recently renovated Chalan Kanoa Beach Hotel, The Aquarius Beach Tower and several small hotels are also located in the area.

Chalan Kanoa is also close to the CNMI's only lake, Lake Susupe.

Education
Commonwealth of the Northern Mariana Islands Public School System operates local public schools. William S. Reyes Elementary School is located in Chalan Kanoa. It is named after the CNMI's first superintendent of education, William Sablan Reyes. It was established as the Findley School for Native Children in 1946 and was later renamed to Chalan Kanoa Elementary School. It received its current name in 1984.

Private schools:
Mount Carmel School
Saipan International School

References

Towns and villages in the Northern Mariana Islands
Saipan